Two Mile Prairie is an area in northern Columbia Township, Boone County, Missouri, United States, northeast of Columbia. Its elevation is 879 feet (268 m).

It shares a name with Two Mile Prairie Elementary School in Columbia. The community is part of the Columbia Metropolitan Statistical Area.

It is a two-mile wide prairie.  It was described as "opulent" in 1908.

References

Further reading
"Area farmers face price squeeze: Grain elevators are filling up quickly." Columbia Daily Tribune (Columbia, MO) (Oct 11, 2007): NA. General OneFile. Gale. TORONTO PUBLIC LIBRARIES (CELPLO). 23 Feb. 2008 <http://find.galenet.com/ips/start.do?prodId=IPS>. Gale Document Number:CJ169738534 "Brothers Frank and John Glenn yesterday took advantage of good weather to reap the annual soybean harvest on their family farm in the Two Mile Prairie area northeast of Columbia."
"Planners settle on Ashland site for sewage plant." Columbia Daily Tribune (Columbia, MO) (August 15, 2007): NA. General OneFile. Gale. TORONTO PUBLIC LIBRARIES (CELPLO). 23 Feb. 2008 <http://find.galenet.com/ips/start.do?prodId=IPS>. Gale Document Number:CJ167634040 "...the Two Mile Prairie task force believes the best location for the new [wastewater treatment] plant is the current Ashland Wastewater Treatment Plant.'

External links
Two Mile Prairie Elementary School

Geography of Columbia, Missouri
Columbia metropolitan area (Missouri)
Grasslands of Missouri